General elections were held in Suriname on 31 October 1977, the first after independence. The result was a victory for the National Party Combination (an alliance of the National Party of Suriname, the Renewed Progressive Party, the Party for National Unity and Solidarity and the Suriname Progressive People's Party), which won 22 of the 39 seats.

Results

References

Suriname
Elections in Suriname
1977 in Suriname
Suriname
Election and referendum articles with incomplete results